Tortilla Army is a British grunge metal band that was formed by singer/guitarist Jim Noble and bassist Sy Morton in Whitstable, Kent in 1998. Tortilla Army went through a succession of members until establishing the four current members, being mainstays Jim Noble and Sy Morton. Drummer Mik Gaffney joined the band in 2003 and lead guitarist Joe Coomes joined the band in 2006.

History
The band established itself as part of the pub/club music scene in Kent, drawing inspiration from 90's grunge bands like Nirvana, Pearl Jam and Alice in Chains among others. The original line-up consisting of singer/guitarist Jim Noble, bassist Sy Morton, drummer Chris Jones and percussionist Colin Lovatt honed their sound with hours of practice, adding the unique (at the time) element of live percussion to their sound and live shows. They released their debut album entitled A New Journey independently in 2002. Drummers come and drummers go, and that's exactly what happened in 2003. Out went founder member Chris Jones in comes Mik Gaffney. Mik immediately put his stamp on the band's sound and style (in fact one of their first song writing sessions yielded fans favorite "Broken"). The new four-piece continued to develop their sound until Colin Lovatt decided to quit the band to continue his life in Australia. Colin has since returned to the UK, and is playing percussion for Get Ape. So Tortilla Army reverted to a trio format, something all three members were comfortable with. After some interest from minor record companies Tortilla Army unexpectedly chose to remain unsigned. Tortilla Army found unexpected local success with "Broken", the band's lead track from their second album of the same name, 2004's Broken. It wasn't until during a string of dates with U.S. act Moth (where they acquired the use of Moth's touring guitarist for a show) did the band feel that a little extra depth was needed. A second guitarist was added in shape of Joe Coomes, the band finally had the perfect line up. Never before did Tortilla Army have such a full sound and the right balance of the right people. Subsequently, Tortilla Army began a small nationwide tour with Swedish heavy metal/hard rock band Freak Kitchen in 2006 bringing along their grunge sound with great live performances. After four years Tortilla Army released their much anticipated third album 2008's Finally. The album was the first to feature recordings from guitarist Joe Coomes whose input included shredding riffs and blistering guitar solos on top of the seasoned tightness of the original trio of Jim Noble, Sy Morton and Mik Gaffney. This seemed that Tortilla Army were onto a winner with their new direction in sound. Tortilla Army has come a very long way from the initial steps in the backroom of the East Kent public house in Whitstable, Kent (spiritual home) to where they are now, and things continue to move forward. With the release of their new EP One for the Living in April 2010, an ever increasing presence on Facebook, Twitter and Myspace, dates with U.S. band's Moth & Fizzgig and upcoming tours with the Mighty Freak Kitchen in 2010 being put together as we speak, the band are going from strength to strength striding forward.

In Feb 2013, it was decided that it was time to call time on Tortilla Army. The band played their last ever gig on Friday 10 May 2013 to a packed Earls in Maidstone. Mik is concentrating on his role in Oi!/punk legends The Last Resort (who just released their latest album 'This Is My England' on Randale Records), whilst Sy has joined Kelly's Heroes on a full-time basis. Sy, Jim and Mik still get together to play random gigs when schedules allow. Jim & Joe also have put together a new act called NE Fingoes, together with drums from the Fool Fighters' Tony Chapman, this new outfit takes pop songs and re covers them in Rock goo!

Style and influences
Tortilla Army's music has been described by fans and critics as grunge metal. The band has cited being influenced by bands such as Kings X, Nirvana and Pantera. These bands inspire Tortilla Army's "catchy vocals, aggressive riffs and melodies" according to band member Sy Morton. The band themselves consider their music as genre free, with Morton going on to state that "We’re simply a rock band with grunge and metal influences, and I’ve said that from Day One". Tortilla Army have been praised in the local press for the band's efforts in their synchronised and melodic song structures. When asked on their views on their looks, members of the band have stated that they would not change their sound or image for a commercial approach; Mortan commented that, "We're more interested in what our music sounds like and entertaining the local crowds than selling out or selling our fans short".

Members

Current members
 Jim Noble – Lead Vocals and Guitar (1998–2013
 Sy Morton – Bass and Vocals (1998–2013
 Mik Gaffney – Drums (2003–2013
 Joe Websper – Lead Guitar (2006–2013

Previous members
 Chris Jones – Drums (1998–2003)
 Colin Lovatt – Percussion (1999–2004)
 Martin Wisbey – Lead Guitar (2005–2006)

Timeline

Discography

Studio albums
 A New Journey (Independent Release, 2002)
 Broken (Independent Release, 2004)
 Live From The Muddy Banks Of The Medway (Independent release 2005)
 Finally (Independent Release, 2008)
 One For The Living (Independent Release, 2010)

Compilation albums
 Archive (Independent Release, 2005)

References

External links
 tortillaarmy.com
 facebook.com/tortilla-army
 myspace.com/tortilla-army
 twitter.com/tortilla-army
 mrgig.com/tortilla-army

English heavy metal musical groups
Grunge musical groups
Musical groups established in 1998